Jean-François Boucher (born December 1, 1985) is a Canadian professional ice hockey winger. He is currently an unrestricted free agent who last played for Kölner Haie in the Deutsche Eishockey Liga (DEL).

Playing career
Boucher attended Yale University where he played four seasons (2004 - 2008) of NCAA Division I men's hockey.

Undrafted, he made his professional debut in Germany playing with ERC Ingolstadt of the Deutsche Eishockey Liga during the 2008–09 season. After one season with Ingolstadt, recording just 4 points in 47 games, Boucher returned to North America and played semi-professionally in the LNAH with the Saint-Georges Cool FM 103.5.

After three seasons developing within Quebec, Boucher embarked on a return to Germany with ERC Ingolstadt from the 2012–13 season. Establishing himself amongst the forwards in a depth checking line role, Boucher remained with Ingolstadt and appeared in 172 games with the club.

On June 1, 2015, Boucher left ERC Ingolstadt to sign a one-year contract with fellow DEL club, Kölner Haie.

Personal
He is the oldest child of Olympic speed skating champion Gaétan Boucher and his German wife.

References

External links

1985 births
Living people
Canadian ice hockey left wingers
ERC Ingolstadt players
Kölner Haie players
Saint-Georges Cool FM 103.5 players
Yale Bulldogs men's ice hockey players
Ice hockey people from Quebec
People from Rosemère, Quebec
Canadian expatriate ice hockey players in Germany